Vasco Bendini  (27 February 1922 – 31 January 2015) was an Italian informalist painter.

Life and career
Born in Bologna, Bendini studied at the Bologna Academy of Fine Arts, under Giorgio Morandi and Virgilio Guidi. In 1956 he was invited to show his work at the 27th edition of the Venice Biennale. This was followed by two more participations, each time with a solo presentation of his work, in 1964 and 1972.

In the late 1970s he eventually re-embraced an Informalist style in his paintings.

References

External links 
  

 
1922 births
2015 deaths
Painters from Bologna
20th-century Italian painters
20th-century Italian male artists
Italian male painters
Italian contemporary artists
21st-century Italian painters
21st-century Italian male artists
Accademia di Belle Arti di Bologna alumni